Molorchus longicollis is a species of beetle in the family Cerambycidae. It was described by John Lawrence LeConte in 1873.

References

Cerambycinae
Beetles described in 1873